The Northern District School Area Board is a small school board in northern Ontario, which manages Armstrong Elementary School in Armstrong and Savant Lake Public School in Savant Lake.

References
 Ontario Ministry of Education: School Board Directory

School districts in Ontario
Education in Thunder Bay District